The 1878–79 season was Morton Football Club's second season in which they competed at a national level, entering the sixth Scottish Cup.

Fixtures and results

Scottish Cup

Friendlies

1. Game was played "on a field behind Cappielow Sugar Refinery".

References

External links
Greenock Morton FC official site

Greenock Morton F.C. seasons
Morton